This is a list of submissions to the 62nd Academy Awards for Best Foreign Language Film. The Academy Award for Best Foreign Language Film was created in 1956 by the Academy of Motion Picture Arts and Sciences to honour non-English-speaking films produced outside the United States. The award is handed out annually, and is accepted by the winning film's director, although it is considered an award for the submitting country as a whole. Countries are invited by the Academy to submit their best films for competition according to strict rules, with only one film being accepted from each country.

For the 62nd Academy Awards, thirty-seven films were submitted in the category Academy Award for Best Foreign Language Film. The bolded titles were the five nominated films, which came from Canada, Denmark, France, Puerto Rico and the eventual winner, Cinema Paradiso, from Italy. Burkina Faso and South Africa submitted films for the first time and Puerto Rico was nominated for the first, and to date, only time.

Submissions

Notes

  The South African submission, Mapantsula, was on the 1989 official AMPAS press release, but not on the 2007 updated list. In 1997, the AMPAS press release announced that Paljas had been selected as South Africa's first-ever submission.

References

62